Chareh Sar (also Romanized as Chāreh Sar; also known as Chahārsar) is a village in Do Hezar Rural District, Khorramabad District, Tonekabon County, Mazandaran Province, Iran. At the 2006 census, its population was 47, in 12 families.

References 

Populated places in Tonekabon County